A number of ships of the French Navy have borne the name Héros ("hero"). Among them: 
 the ship of the line  (1701-1719)
 the 74-gun ship of the line , destroyed at the Battle of Quiberon Bay
 the 74-gun ship of the line , built in 1778, flagship of Suffren, scuttled by British at Toulon in 1793
 the 74-gun  ship of the line 
 the 118-gun  ship of the line   (1813-1828)
 A converted Spanish trailer
 , a  submarine

References

French Navy ship names